The city of Portland, Oregon, United States, has experienced a boom in the number of food carts due to relatively low regulation compared to other North American cities.

History
In 1965, the first food cart in Portland, which sold kosher hot dogs, was set up across from Portland City Hall. In 1976, Portland opened up all of its downtown parks to competitive bidding. A 2001 report in The Oregonian stated Portland was home to 175 carts, with fierce competition for the four cart spaces available since 1987 in the South Park Blocks. A bidding war in February 2001 led to a combined price of $192,000 for the spaces. There was also a large cluster, often referred to as a food cart pod, at Fifth and Stark street, and one food cart had been operating since 1980. In 2010 it was estimated that there are between 450 and 671 carts citywide.

Regulation
Most North American cities sought to make the street for cars in the mid twentieth century, and thus imposed strict regulations on food carts, which led to few food carts remaining. In comparison, Portland has low regulation, such as having nearly no requirement for a food cart to have a particular structure, which makes the cost of entry low, and thus leading to a proliferation of carts. Many regulations are also not enforced as long as health and safety are not impacted.

Notable pods and foods carts
Notable food cart pods in Portland include the Cart Blocks, Cartlandia, Cartopia, Carts on Foster, Collective Oregon Eateries, Hawthorne Asylum, Nob Hill Food Carts, Portland Mercado, and Prost Marketplace, and formerly the Alder Street food cart pod (1990s–2019).

Notable businesses which have operated as food carts in the city include:

 Baby Blue Pizza
 Bing Mi
 Birrieria La Plaza
 Birrieria PDX
 Chicken and Guns
 El Cubo de Cuba
 Deadstock Coffee
 Desi PDX
 Dirty Lettuce
 E-san Thai Cuisine
 El Gallo Taqueria
 Erica's Soul Food
 Fifty Licks
 Flying Fish Company
 Fried Egg I'm in Love
 Gracie's Apizza
 The Grilled Cheese Grill
 Holy Trinity Barbecue
 Jojo
 Kee's Loaded Kitchen
 Kim Jong Grillin'
 Le Bistro Montage
 Matt's BBQ
 Matta
 Nacheaux
 Nong's Khao Man Gai
 Paladin Pie
 PDX Sliders
 Ruthie's
 Shanghai's Best
 Stretch the Noodle
 Tamale Boy
 Tierra del Sol
 Viking Soul Food

References

External links